Carbis is a hamlet  east of Roche in Cornwall, England.

In the 19th century the mining of china clay was an important industry around St Austell indeed the area has the nickname of the "china clay country". The Rosemellyn China Clay company went into liquidation in 1918. A short railway branch line (now dismantled) ran from Carbis Wharf to the sidings at nearby Bugle as part of the Cornwall Minerals Railway.

References

Hamlets in Cornwall